Brent Petrus (March 30, 1975 – March 20, 2022) was an American football quarterback who played one season with the New York Dragons of the Arena Football League (AFL). He played college football and basketball at the University of Cincinnati.

Professional career
Petrus signed with the New York Dragons of the AFL on March 7, 2001. He was released by the Dragons on April 16, 2001. He signed with the Dragons on January 21, 2002, and was placed on injured reserve on May 2, 2002. Petrus was waived by the Dragons on January 26, 2003. He signed with the Dragons on March 26, 2003.

Death
Petrus died on March 20, 2022, in Elyria, Ohio.

References

External links
Just Sports Stats
College stats

1975 births
2022 deaths
American football quarterbacks
Cincinnati Bearcats football players
Cincinnati Bearcats men's basketball players
New York Dragons players
Sportspeople from Brooklyn
Players of American football from New York City
American men's basketball players